Swimming is one of the original sports that have started from 1960 Summer Paralympics and is still contested.

Classification

In swimming, there are ten sport classes which range between physical impairment (such as paraplegia and blindness).

Events
Paralympic swimmers participate in four different lengths: 50 metre, 100 metre, 150 metre (SM3 individual medley events) 200 metre and 400 metre (individual medley events). In the beginning of the Paralympic Games, they competed in three lengths: 25 metre, 50 metre and 75 metre events, 25 metre and 75 metre events were abolished in the 1988 Summer Paralympics.

Defunct events

Men's events
Backstroke (held since 1968)
Breaststroke (held since 1964)
Freestyle (held since 1960)
Individual medley (held since 1972)
Freestyle relay (held since
Medley relay (held since 1968)

Women's events
Backstroke (held since 1968)
Breaststroke (held since 1964)
Freestyle (held since 1960)
Individual medley (held since 1972)
Medley relay (held since 1968)

See also
Paralympic swimming
List of Paralympic records in swimming

References

External links
World Para Swimming

Swim
Paralympic medalists